Aarla is a village in Vinni Parish, Lääne-Viru in Estonia.

References

Villages in Lääne-Viru County